George Fai (born 18 October 1996) is an Australian professional rugby league footballer who plays as a lock or prop who played for the Brisbane Broncos in the NRL.

Background
Fai was born in Logan City, Queensland, Australia.

Career
He appeared for the Brisbane Broncos in the defeat by the Warrington Wolves in the 2017 World Club Series.

On 27 May 2017 Rd 12, Fai made his NRL debut for Brisbane against the New Zealand Warriors.

References

External links
Brisbane Broncos profile
Broncos profile
NRL profile

Broncos 2019 profile

1996 births
Living people
Australian sportspeople of Samoan descent
Australian rugby league players
Brisbane Broncos players
Rugby league locks
Rugby league players from Logan, Queensland
Rugby league props
Souths Logan Magpies players